Douglas Brose (born 11 December 1985) is a Brazilian karateka. He is a three-time gold medalist in the men's kumite 60 kg event at the World Karate Championships. He also won the gold medal in the men's 60 kg event at the 2015 Pan American Games held in Toronto, Canada.

At the 2013 World Games held in Cali, Colombia, he won the silver medal in the men's kumite 60 kg event.

He won the gold medal in the men's kumite 60 kg event at the 2021 World Karate Championships held in Dubai, United Arab Emirates.

He won the silver medal in the men's kumite 60 kg event at the 2022 World Games held in Birmingham, United States.

References

External links 
 

Living people
1985 births
Place of birth missing (living people)
Brazilian male karateka
World Games gold medalists
World Games silver medalists
Competitors at the 2009 World Games
Competitors at the 2013 World Games
Competitors at the 2017 World Games
Competitors at the 2022 World Games
World Games medalists in karate
Pan American Games medalists in karate
Pan American Games gold medalists for Brazil
Pan American Games silver medalists for Brazil
Pan American Games bronze medalists for Brazil
Karateka at the 2011 Pan American Games
Karateka at the 2015 Pan American Games
Karateka at the 2019 Pan American Games
Medalists at the 2011 Pan American Games
Medalists at the 2015 Pan American Games
Medalists at the 2019 Pan American Games
South American Games medalists in karate
South American Games gold medalists for Brazil
Competitors at the 2010 South American Games
Competitors at the 2022 South American Games
21st-century Brazilian people